Cauldron is the first album from San Francisco-based psychedelic rock band Fifty Foot Hose. The album features a variety of homemade synths formed by the hands of bassist Louis "Cork" Marcheschi.

Track listing
"And After" (Cork Marcheschi) 2:05
"If Not This Time" (David Blossom) 3:40
"Opus 777" (Marcheshi) 0:22
"The Things That Concern You" (Larry Evans) 3:25
"Opus 11" (Marcheschi) 0:22
"Red the Sign Post" (Blossom, Ted Roswicky) 2:55 
"For Paula" (Marcheschi) 0:24
"Rose" (Blossom) 5:03
"Fantasy" (Blossom) 10:08
"God Bless the Child" (Billie Holiday) 2:42
"Cauldron" (Marcheschi, Blossom, Kim Kimsey) 4:55

Personnel
Nancy Blossom: vocals
David Blossom: guitars, piano, Kalimba
Larry Evans: guitars, vocals
Cork Marcheschi: audio generators, theremin, electronics, siren
Terry Hansley: electric bass
Kim Kimsey: drums, percussion

References

1967 debut albums
Fifty Foot Hose albums
Limelight Records albums
Mercury Records albums
Albums produced by Dan Healy (soundman)